Commodore Jacob Nicholas Jones (March 1768 – August 3, 1850) was an officer in the United States Navy during the Quasi-War with France, the First Barbary War, the Second Barbary War, and the War of 1812.

Biography
Jones' birthplace was on a farm about one mile northwest of the town of Smyrna, Delaware. His father was a farmer of exemplary moral and religious character and his mother was of a family greatly respected. She died when he was an infant. His father soon followed her to the grave and at four years of age he was an orphan. It is not clear how he became a doctor. Educated in medicine and practicing as a doctor, he was later appointed as Clerk of the Delaware Supreme Court. He was married to Anna Matilda Sykes, daughter of James Sykes the 15th Governor of Delaware; she died before he joined the United States Navy.

Midshipman
Jones joined the United States Navy in 1799 at the age of 31, very old for the times, when a midshipman could be as young as 10. Some think he joined the Navy because of grief after the death of his wife. He spent 22 months as an acting midshipman.

Lieutenant
During the Quasi-War with France, he served under Commodore John Barry in the frigate  and was commissioned a lieutenant February 27, 1801. On October 31, 1803, he was taken prisoner with the rest of Philadelphias crew by the Bey of Tripoli and held until liberated in June 1805.

Master Commandant

In October 1812, Jones and Wasp sailed on an Atlantic cruise. On October 13 he captured the British 12-gun brig HMS Dolphin.

Despite storm damage to his ship, he attacked a British convoy on October 18 and, following an intense battle, captured the Royal Navy sloop of war , in a battle that became quite famous. Both combatants were seriously damaged and he soon fell victim to the powerful ship of the line . Still, Jones was widely admired and when he returned to the United States after an exchange of prisoners, he received a gold medal from the United States Congress.

Captain
Jones was promoted to the rank of captain in March 1813 and given command of the frigate . He spent time in Decatur's squadron, which was bottled up at New London during 1814. Later, Captain Jones was sent to the Lake Ontario theater, where he commanded the frigate  during the last year of the war.

During the second and final Barbary War, in 1815, Jones again commanded Macedonian. Service as captain of the frigate  followed in 1816–1818.

Commodore
Jones was Commodore of the United States' squadrons in the Mediterranean in 1821–1823 and in the Pacific in 1826–1829. He was a Navy Commissioner in Washington, DC, between those tours at sea and held important commands ashore at Baltimore and New York during the 1830s and 1840s. He received his final assignment, as commandant of the Philadelphia Naval Asylum in 1847. Commodore Jacob Jones held that position until his death.

Death and legacy

Jones died on August 3, 1850, and is interred at the Wilmington and Brandywine Cemetery in Wilmington, Delaware.

Three ships, USS Jacob Jones, have been named for him.  Jones Island of Washington state is also named for Jones.

References

External links

NHC Biography and Photographs

1768 births
1850 deaths
American military personnel of the First Barbary War
Burials at Wilmington and Brandywine Cemetery
People from Smyrna, Delaware
American military personnel of the Quasi-War
United States Navy officers
United States Navy personnel of the War of 1812
Congressional Gold Medal recipients
American military personnel of the Second Barbary War
Commanders of the USS Constitution
War of 1812 prisoners of war held by the United Kingdom